Tham Rong is a tambon (subdistrict) of Ban Lat District, Phetchaburi Province, western Thailand.

History
The name Tham Rong directly translated as "Rong cave". It is called after the local Buddhist temple of the same name, Wat Tham Rong, an ancient temple and local spiritual anchor. Near the temple is the cave called "Tham Luang Pho Dam" (ถ้ำหลวงพ่อดำ, ; lit: "reverend father black cave"). The evidence inside proves this subdistrict has been existed for thousand years.

Tham Rong was originally is in the area of Tamru. At that time, there were a total of 12 muban (village), later in 1979 there was a separation of Tam Rong from Tamru, with the Phetchaburi River as the boundary line.

Geography
Most of the terrain is a floodplain with low mountains and waterway running through every village. The Phetchaburi River flows through the western part. Therefore, it is suitable for agricultural activities, such as rice farming, fruit orchards, etc.

Neighbouring subdistricts are (from the north clockwise): Rai Makham in its district, Tha Yang in Tha Yang District, Tamru in its district.

Administration
The entire area of Tham Rong is under the administration of Subdistrict Administrative Organization (SAO) Tham Rong (อบต.ถ้ำรงค์).

It also consists of six administrative villages.

Economy
Tham Rong is promoted as a cultural and community attraction.

Asian palmyra palm is an important cash crop.

Places
Wat Tham Rong and Tham Luang Pho Dam
Wat Muang Ngam
Thai Kite Making and Learning Centre
Uncle Thanom Palm Orchard

References

External links

Tambon of Phetchaburi Province